The Australia women's national indoor hockey team are Australia's national women's indoor hockey team. As of January 2016, they are ranked 8th in the world. Australia competes internationally in indoor hockey, with the Australian women’s indoor team undertaking a tour annually. Every four years, Australia competes in the FIH Indoor Hockey World Cup. The Australian national indoor team is nominated and selected from the indoor Australian Championships.

World Cup Rankings
In the first Indoor Hockey World Cup, held in Germany in 2003, the Australian team came 9th in the final standings. Their best placing is 6th, achieved in the 2007 World Cup in Vienna, Austria. In the 2011 and 2015 World Cups, they finished in 8th spot. In 2018 the Australian team finished 6th, thereby equalling their best ever result.

Tournament records

Indoor Hockey World Cup
2003 - 9th
2007 - 6th
2011 - 8th
2015 - 8th
2018 - 6th
2023 - 7th

Current squad
2019 Australian Indoor Squad

 Lauren AUSTIN (WA) - 2007, 2018 World Cups
 Tayla BRITTON (WA)
 Tegan BOUCHER (VIC) - 2011, 2015, 2018 World Cups
 Tamsin BUNT (NSW) - 2018 World Cup
 Erin BURNS (NSW)
 Caitlin BURNS (NSW)
 Elizabeth DUGUID (WA) (C) - 2018 World Cup
 Holly EVANS (SA) - 2011, 2015 World Cups
 Lisa FARRELL (NSW) - 2018 World Cup
 Kyah GRAY (NSW)  - 2015, 2018 World Cups
 Amelia LEARD (NSW)
 Emma McCLEISH (NSW) - 2011, 2015, 2018 World Cups
 Claudia NEILSEN (WA)
 Emma SCRIVEN (NSW)
 Alissia PEARSON (TAS)
 Anna ROBERTS (WA)
                                         
Australian U21 Squad 
 Brooke ANDERSON (VIC)
 Emma CORCORAN (NSW)
 Maddie DE SILVA (WA)
 Aymee DOWELL (QLD)
 Litiana FIELD (NSW)
 Kelsey HUGHES (NSW)
 Sarah JOHNSTON (NSW)
 Claudia NEILSEN (WA)                                                    
 Keeleigh McCAULEY (NSW)
 Zoe NEWMAN (NSW)
 Aleisha PRICE (ACT)
 Emma REID (WA)
 Riley SUTHERLAND (VIC)
 Helena TOBBE (NSW)
 Taylor THOMSON (ACT)
 Nicole YEARBURY (QLD)
                                          
Off Field Team
 Mark Sandhu – Head Coach/Selector - 2003, 2007, 2011, 2018 World Cups
 David Ogden – Asst Coach - 2011, 2018 World Cups
 Danah Dunkeld - Manager
 Kris Hooley - Manager

Recent Tournaments
In December 2015, the Australian team competed in the Spar Four Nations invitational women's tournament, held in South Africa at the University of KwaZulu-Natal sports hall. The four competing nations include South Africa, USA, Namibia and Australia. Final standing was 3rd place, beating USA for the bronze medal. Australian Jessica Bestall was named player of the tournament.

Spar Four Nations Squad

 Kyah GRAY, NSW, Captain
 Emily SECCULL, VIC, Vice Captain
 Jessica BESTALL
 Caitlin BURNS, NSW
 Sassie ECONOMOS, ACT
 Sarah GOODE, VIC
 Trudi PEDERSEN, QLD
 Sarah DARLING, VIC
 Lenny MURPHY, TAS
 Emma REID, WA
 Maddie SMITH, QLD, goalie
 Erin JUDD, WA, goalie

See also
 Kookaburras – Australia men's national field hockey team
 Australian field hockey players
 Australia women's national field hockey team
 Indoor field hockey
 Indoor Hockey World Cup

References

External links
 Official website

Hockey, women's
Women's national indoor hockey teams